Sunday Airlines, a subsidiary charter airline of SCAT Airlines, operates services to the following destinations:

Destinations

References

Sunday